KDTF-LD (channel 36) is a low-power television station in San Diego, California, United States, affiliated with the Spanish-language UniMás network. It is owned by Entravision Communications alongside Class A Univision affiliate KBNT-CD (channel 17); it is also sister to Azteca América affiliate XHAS-TDT (channel 33) and Milenio Televisión affiliate XHDTV-TDT (channel 49). The latter two stations are owned by Mexican-based Televisora Alco, which is 40% owned by Entravision. All four stations share studios on Ruffin Road in San Diego's Kearny Mesa section; KDTF-LD's transmitter is located on San Miguel Mountain in Spring Valley.

History
The station affiliated with Telefutura, the forerunner to UniMás, sometime in 2006, after talks reportedly broke down with sister station and former UPN affiliate XHUPN (channel 49, now XHDTV-TDT).

Subchannels
The station's digital signal is multiplexed:

KDTF began broadcasting its digital signal on UHF channel 51 on May 14, 2009, multicasting KBNT-CA and XHDTV.

References

External links
 

Low-power television stations in the United States
UniMás network affiliates
DTF-LD
Television channels and stations established in 1997
DTF-LD
Entravision Communications stations
1997 establishments in California